A list of American films released in 2003. The Lord of the Rings: The Return of the King won the Academy Award for Best Picture, the BAFTA Award for Best Film and the Golden Globe Award for Best Motion Picture – Drama. Lost in Translation won the Golden Globe Award for Best Motion Picture – Comedy or Musical and the Satellite Award for Best Motion Picture, Comedy or Musical.

Finding Nemo won the Academy Award for Best Animated Feature.

The Fog of War won the Academy Award for Best Documentary (Feature). Amandla!: A Revolution in Four-Part Harmony won the Satellite Award for Best Motion Picture, Documentary.

American Splendor won the Dramatic Grand Jury Prize at the Sundance Film Festival. Elephant won the prestigious Palme d'Or award at the Cannes Film Festival.

Gigli won the Golden Raspberry Award for Worst Picture.

Box Office 
The highest-grossing American films released in 2003, by domestic box office gross revenue, are as follows:

See also
 2003 in American television
 2003 in the United States

References

External links

 
 List of 2003 box office number-one films in the United States

Lists of 2003 films by country or language
Films
2003